Yeager is a surname.

Yeager may also refer to:

Yeager, Kentucky, United States
Yeager, Oklahoma, United States
Yeager (film), a 2003 film directed by John Moore
Yeager Airport, airport in West Virginia, United States
Yeager v. United States

See also
Jagger (disambiguation)
Jagr (disambiguation)
Jäger (disambiguation)